The 2011 Formula D season (officially titled Formula Drift Pro Championship) was the eighth  season of the Formula D series. The season began on April 9 in Long Beach and ended on October 8 at Toyota Speedway at Irwindale.

Schedule

Championship standings
Event winners in bold.

External links 
 Official Formula D Website

Formula D seasons
Formula D
Formula D